A  (historically: kjøbstad, kjöbstad, or kaupstad) is an old Scandinavian term for a "market town" that was used in the Kingdom of Denmark-Norway for several hundred years. Kjøpstads were places of trade and exporting materials (e.g. timber, flour, iron and other common goods). Towns were given the "dignity" or rank of being referred to as a kjøpstad when they reached a certain population and had established means of industry and other notable items such as dock yards, steam mills, iron works, churches, grammar schools. The citizens of a kjøpstad were able to buy and sell goods and conduct other economic activities.

Ladested
These were a port or harbour with a monopoly to import and export goods and materials in both the port and a surrounding outlying district. These places were usually subordinate to the nearest kjøpstad. Typically, these were locations for exporting timber, and importing grain and goods. Local farm goods and timber sales were all required to pass through merchants at either a small seaport (ladested) or a market town (kjøpstad) prior to export. This encouraged local merchants to ensure trading went through them, which was so effective in limiting unsupervised sales (smuggling) that customs revenues increased from less than 30% of the total tax revenues in 1600 to more than 50% of the total taxes by 1700.

History
Norway developed market towns at a much later period than other parts of Europe. The reasons for this late development are complex but include the sparse population, lack of urbanisation, no real manufacturing industries, and no cash economy. 

The first kjøpstads date back to the 11th and 12th centuries when the King of Norway sought to centralize commerce in specific places that offered strategic significance, providing a local economic base for construction of fortifications and population for defense of the area. It also served to restrict the Hanseatic League merchants from trading in areas other than those designated.  King Olaf established a market town at Bergen in the 11th century, and it soon became the residence of many wealthy families. 

Import and export was to be conducted only through market towns, to allow oversight of commerce and to simplify the imposition of excise taxes and customs duties.  This practice served to encourage growth in areas which had strategic significance, providing a local economic base for the construction of fortifications and sufficient population to defend the area.  It also served to restrict Hanseatic League merchants from trading in areas other than those designated.

Under the 1838 formannskapsdistrikt law, both kjøpstads and ladesteds were granted the ability to set up a town council just like the other cities and rural municipalities in the country.  Most kjøpstads and ladesteds did this, although some did not do so immediately.

Norwegian "market towns" died out and were replaced by free markets during the 19th century. During the 1950s, there were 44 kjøpstads and 20 ladesteds that were had their own town councils in Norway.  In 1952, the legal distinctions for both the ladested and kjøpstad were removed from the Constitution of Norway and they were the same (legally) as any other town (by) in Norway.  In 1992, all municipalities received equal status under the law, finally removing all legal differences between town-municipalities and rural-municipalities.  Since then, a town designation is simply a title or historical name, with no legal status.

Media gallery

See also
Köping
Kaupang
Købstad

References

Market towns
+